Maret Vaher (born 12 January 1973 in Saverna) is an Estonian orienteer. She competed at the  1994 World Ski Orienteering Championships in Val di Non, where she won a bronze medal in the long distance, and placed 7th in the relay with the Estonian team.

See also
List of orienteers

References

External links
 
 Maret Vaher at World of O Runners

1973 births
Living people
People from Kanepi Parish
Estonian orienteers
Female orienteers
Ski-orienteers